Dunst may refer to:
 Dunst (performance group), a queer performance network in Copenhagen, Denmark
 Kirsten Dunst, American actress
 Barbara Dunst, Austrian footballer
 Daniel Dunst, Austrian footballer
 Tony Dunst, American professional poker player
 Dunst Bruce, member of Chumbawamba, an English rock band
 Dunst Opening, an uncommon chess opening known by many names